Potebniamyces is a genus of fungi within the Cryptomycetaceae family.

References

External links
Index Fungorum
Mycobank

Leotiomycetes